Live and Kicking is a live album by Swedish musician Eagle-Eye Cherry released in Spring 2007. According to a letter posted by Cherry on his website, the album was released in Brazil in 2006. 

The photograph appearing on the cover of the album was taken by Jessica and Andy Besirov during an Eagle-Eye Cherry gig in Hamburg, Germany. They used the photo also in their exhibition "Watch this Tune."

Track listing

References

External links
Eagle Eye Cherry Website

Eagle-Eye Cherry albums
2007 live albums